Cupriavidus pampae is a Gram-negative, oxidase- and catalase-positive, aerobic, non-spore-forming, motile bacterium of the genus Cupriavidus and  family Burkholderiaceae, which was isolated from the agricultural soil of the humid pampa region in Argentina.

References

External links
Type strain of Cupriavidus pampae at BacDive -  the Bacterial Diversity Metadatabase

Burkholderiaceae
Bacteria described in 2010